Indus Arthur (born Indus Jo Saugstad; April 28, 1941 – December 29, 1984) was a 1960s film and television actress.

Early life
Arthur was from Los Angeles County. Both she and her grandmother were named for the Indus River in Tibet. Her grandmother once visited the river, and Arthur wished to do so. Her father, Mac Julian, was a still cameraman for Hollywood studios. He opposed the fact that Arthur and her two sisters were becoming involved in films. Arthur attended Hollywood High School and Trinity College in Dublin, Ireland. She also acted with the Dublin Players.

Career

Stage
Arthur signed as the leading lady for the mystery play, Uncle Marston, in April 1963. The production was staged at the Stage Society Theater in Los Angeles, California. A reviewer referred to her acting prowess in the role of an agitated Derbyshire heiress, commenting "Arthur is a lovely, polished performer."  Previously she had appeared in theater in London, England and at the Dublin Playhouse in Dublin, Ireland.

Film
Arthur appeared  in Sydney Pollack's directing debut The Slender Thread (1965) as an employee of a crisis clinic which counsels potential suicide victims. She was assigned a role in Alvarez Kelly (1966), a western that was set during the era of the American Civil War. It featured a Mexican cattleman played by William Holden and a military colonel depicted by Richard Widmark. Arthur's other film roles were in Angel's Flight (1965), M*A*S*H (1970), and The Christian Licorice Store (1971).

Television
Arthur was a prolific actress on television. Among her many appearances are episodes of the Kraft Suspense Theater (1964–1965), The Alfred Hitchcock Hour (1965), Ben Casey (1965), T.H.E. Cat (1966), The Virginian (1966), The Wild Wild West (1966), Dragnet (1967), and General Hospital (1963, 1970–1973). She made two guest appearances on Perry Mason in 1965 as Nancy Bryant, in the Case of the Telltale Tap, and in 1966, as Barbara Kramer in "The Case of the Dead Ringer".

Original Renaissance Faire

Indus Arthur played the harp and sang at the Original Renaissance Faire in Agoura, California. She had a beautiful voice and recorded several music cassettes of period folk songs. One of her most loved albums, The Rose and The Briar,  featured "Barbara Allen" a Scottish tale of unrequited love and death.

Death
Indus Arthur died in Los Angeles County in 1984 of complications from a brain tumor at age 43.

Filmography

References

External links

1941 births
1984 deaths
20th-century American actresses
Actresses from Los Angeles
American film actresses
American stage actresses
American television actresses
Deaths from cancer in California
Deaths from skin cancer
Singers from Los Angeles
Western (genre) film actresses